The military ranks of Niger are the military insignia used by the Niger Armed Forces. Niger is a landlocked country, and does therefore not possess a navy. Being a former colony of France, Niger shares a rank structure similar to that of France.

Commissioned officer ranks
The rank insignia of commissioned officers.

Other ranks
The rank insignia of non-commissioned officers and enlisted personnel.

References

External links
 

Niger
Military of Niger